Kevin King and Juan Carlos Spir were the defending champions, but Spir did not participate. King partnered with Dean O'Brien and lost in the semifinals.

Guillermo Durán and Horacio Zeballos won the title, defeating Sergio Galdos and Guido Pella in the final, 7–6(7–4), 6–4.

Seeds

Draw

References
 Main Draw

San Luis Open Challenger Tour - Doubles
San Luis Potosí Challenger